Ellopostoma is a small genus of loaches native to Southeast Asia.  This is the only genus in the family Ellopostomatidae, having been confirmed as being in a family of its own by M. Kottelat in his review of the loaches in 2012.

Species
The currently recognized species in this genus are:
 Ellopostoma megalomycter (Vaillant, 1902)
 Ellopostoma mystax H. H. Tan & K. K. P. Lim, 2002 (enigmatic loach)

References

Ellopostomatidae
Fish of Asia